The Grand People's Study House is the central library located in the North Korean capital, Pyongyang. The building is situated on Kim Il-sung Square by the banks of the Taedong River.

Features

The Study House was constructed in a traditional Korean style in April 1982 over a period of 21 months to celebrate leader Kim Il-sung's 70th birthday. The library was opened as the "centre for the project of intellectualising the whole of society and a sanctuary of learning for the entire people." The library is located in the center of the capital – the Central District of Pyongyang – "which is one of the most important neighbourhoods in the country because it is the national governmental district. Beside the library is the Supreme People's Assembly and other governmental office blocks. Directly in front of the library...is the Kim Il Sung Square – the third largest public square in the world – where the country's national events take place." For major media coverage, "the library serves as a grand backdrop to...speeches, military and nuclear parades, and carefully choreographed spectacles celebrating national holidays."

The building can house up to 30 million books, of which it contains around 10,800 documents, books and "on the spot guidance" Kim Il-sung wrote. Foreign publications are available only with special permission. Writings of Kim Jong-il are also included. Almost all materials "are kept within closed stacks accessible only to librarians and library staff. A person can search the online or print catalogues to discover what is in the collection...If a borrowed item is late, an official library notification is sent to the offender's employer, who must encourage his or her employee to immediately return it."

The library is the national centre of Juche studies, with one North Korean guide reporting to study the "Great Leader" Kim Il-sung and "Dear Leader" Kim Jong-il for a total of 90 minutes a day. Lectures on a variety of subjects also take place. Also, the Juche Tower – the physical manifestation of North Korea's Communist brand – is directly across from the library on the other side of the Taedong River. Kim Il Sung's "educational philosophy of 'study while working' is regarded as a guiding principle for the library system, as well as for those people who use the library. The library figures as a central component of 'study while working' – an educational place that North Koreans can visit and use to further their socialist training, increase their personal self-reliance through lifelong learning, and develop a greater love and respect for the Kim family...The placement of the Grand People's Study House and the Juche Tower across from each other is meant to cement the relationship between the people and Juche communism. The Grand People's Study House is therefore more than a prominent feature of the capital. It is also an icon of the nation, Juche communism, and the Eternal President himself."

Significance
In his two-part account of North Korean libraries, library and information scientist Marc Kosciejew, uses the conceptual framework of library-as-place to better illuminate their significance: "first, they play numerous significant roles in the lives of North Koreans, as ideological places, cult of personality places, governmental power places, and social places. Second, they help promote, maintain and entrench Juche communist control through tightly controlled and monitored information, collections, events, exhibitions and extravaganzas. Third, the Grand People's Study House – as a representative of all libraries – makes a strong physical and symbolic statement: it is a special place where civics, religion, national identity, and cult of personality meet and are imagined. And, finally, although they are instruments of state control, the fact that libraries offer at least some access to information is notable for such a secretive country."

Although not the national library of North Korea, it acts as a sort of "quasi-national library" alongside the official National Central Library.

Computers and librarianship

The library has numerous spacious computer rooms with modern computers providing access to the North Korean intranet. Computer education is compulsory in North Korea and computer science "has become the most popular area of study, besides the Juche, for military officers and university students. It is a sign of prestige if one has a computer-related office job. Librarianship, therefore, is a high-status profession since it requires computers and computer literacy to develop and maintain the electronic catalogues and digital collections. For those North Koreans who do not have computer-related jobs, accessing computers at the library... gives them the opportunity to join those of higher ranks." The curator is Choi Heui-jung.

See also
List of national libraries

References

External links

 
Interactive 360° Virtual Tour of lobby and reading room  

Buildings and structures in Pyongyang
Library buildings completed in 1982
History of North Korea
North Korea
North Korean culture
Libraries in North Korea
1982 establishments in North Korea
20th-century architecture in North Korea